Severe Tropical Cyclone Joni was a damaging tropical cyclone that impacted the island nations of Tuvalu and Fiji. It was first noted within the South Pacific Convergence Zone at the start of December 1992, as a shallow tropical depression in the vicinity of the island nation Tuvalu. Over the next few days the system gradually developed further as it affected Tuvalu, before it was declared to be a tropical cyclone and named Joni by the Fiji Meteorological Service (FMS) during December 7. Over the next couple of days the system intensified further as it was steered south-westwards and posed a threat towards the Fijian dependency of Rotuma and the French territory of Wallis and Futuna. The system subsequently peaked as a Category 4 severe tropical cyclone on the Australian tropical cyclone intensity scale as it approached the Fijian Islands during December 10. Over the next couple of days the system moved through the Fijian Islands, before it became an extratropical cyclone during December 13. The system was last noted during the next day as it was absorbed by a mid-latitude trough of low pressure to the east of New Zealand.

Joni caused gale to storm force winds on the Tuvuluan island of Niulakita and minor damage to most of the Tuvuluan islands. The main impacts of Joni in Fiji were confined to the Western Division, with the islands of Yasawa, Mamanuca, Viti Levu, Kadavu and Vatulele being the worst affected areas. Damages in both Tuvalu and Fiji were exacerbated a month later by Severe Tropical Cyclones Nina and Kina interacting with each other. Due to the impact of this system, the name Joni was subsequently retired from the list of names for the region by the World Meteorological Organization.

Meteorological history

At the start of December 1992, a shallow tropical depression developed along the South Pacific Convergence Zone in the vicinity of Tuvalu. Over the next few days the system persisted near Tuvalu, before it started to move south-eastwards and develop further during December 5. Over the next couple of days, the system slowly deepened as it organised further and caused gale to storm force winds on the island of Niulakita and strong squally winds over the rest of Tuvalu. During December 7, the Fiji Meteorological Service (FMS) reported that the depression had developed into a Category 1 tropical cyclone on the Australian tropical cyclone intensity scale and named it Joni. After it had been named the system passed near Niulakita as it was steered towards the southwest by a low to mid level flow and intensified further.

The FMS classified Joni as a Category 3 severe tropical cyclone during December 9, after an eye had become apparent in satellite imagery. The system subsequently slowed down and started to recurve and move southwards towards Fiji, due to a weakness in the subtropical ridge of high pressure. Early on December 10, the FMS reported that Joni had peaked as a Category 4 severe tropical cyclone, with 10-minute sustained wind speeds of 165 km/h (105 mph). The JTWC also reported at around this time that the system had peaked with 1-minute sustained wind speeds of 205 km/h (125 mph), which made it equivalent to a Category 3 hurricane on the Saffir–Simpson hurricane wind scale. Over the next few hours the system was located by radar, until it passed near or over the island of Vatulele. After passing near the island, the system moved south-eastwards towards Kadavu and Ono-i-Lau, with the eye of the system passing directly over Kadavu during December 11. The system subsequently started to weaken and transition into an extratropical cyclone, as it entered a region of strong vertical wind shear and cooler sea waters. The system was declared to be an extratropical cyclone early on December 13, before it was absorbed by a mid-latitude trough of low pressure to the east of New Zealand during December 14.

Preparations and impact
Severe Tropical Cyclone Joni impacted the island nations of Tuvalu and Fiji, while it also threatened the Fijian dependency of Rotuma and the French territory of Wallis and Futuna. The majority of the Tuvaluan islands suffered minor damage from Joni, while in Fiji the system caused a moderate to severe amount of damage. Due to the impact of this system, the name Joni was subsequently retired, from the list of names for the region by the World Meteorological Organization. This would normally mean that the name would not be used again in the region, however, the name remained on the list and was used during the 2008–09 season.

During its developing stages, Joni was the first of two tropical cyclones to affect Tuvalu during the 1992–93 season. As the system started to affect the islands during December 5, the FMS issued a gale warning for Niulakita, while strong wind warnings were issued for the rest of the island nation. Joni subsequently passed near Niulakita during December 7, where it caused gale to storm force winds and minor damage to the islands. A tropical cyclone alert was issued for Wallis and Futuna during January 6, while a gale warning was issued for Rotuma during January 7. There was subsequently no damage reported in either the French Territory or the Fijian dependency.

Between December 9–11, 1992, Joni became the first named tropical cyclone to directly impact the Fiji Islands since Severe Tropical Cyclone Sina of 1990. At various times between December 7 – 11, the whole of the main Fijian islands were placed under either a gale, storm or hurricane-force wind warning by the FMS. Ahead of the system affecting Fiji, international and domestic flights to and from the Nadi International Airport were cancelled during December 9 and 10, while ships and small boats in Lautoka were moved to a nearby river. Hundreds of tourists on Fiji's offshore islands were evacuated to the mainland before the cyclone hit, while around 350 elected to ride out the system at island resorts. Other preparations included the erection of hurricane shutters, while people rushed to stock up on supplies with shelves cleared of emergency supplies. On some islands, villagers were evacuated to community centres, schools and churches at the height of the storm.

Joni's impact on Fiji was generally confined to the Western Division, with the islands of Yasawa, Mamanuca, Viti Levu, Kadavu and Vatulele being the worst affected areas. The system caused high seas and widespread flooding including in several rivers on Viti Levu, which led to a substantial loss of livestock. In the immediate aftermath of the system a total of ten people were left missing, including a group of three fishermen in the Yasawa Islands. A group of three females on a fishing trip also went missing and were later found on an offshore island. A search party of four men went missing off Vanua Levu, while looking for the women, however, one swam ashore, while the other three were picked up by a cargo ship. Parts of Fiji's main cities of Suva, Nadi, and Lautoka were left without power, as falling trees brought down power lines. The Fijian Government reported that coconut plantations had been extensively damaged and that there was limited communications with the Western Division. Despite Joni's eye passing directly over Kadavu during December 11, the damage on the island was limited to wave induced coastal erosion, root crop damage and the loss of a few trees. During December 12, an army helicopter was deployed to conduct a damage survey of offshore islands. A total of six people were subsequently arrested in Suva and Nadi on December 14, in relation to a series of burglaries, committed during power blackouts caused by the cyclone. Joni's damage in both Tuvalu and Fiji was exacerbated a month later, by Severe Tropical Cyclones Nina and Kina interacting with each other.

See also
Cyclone Evan

References

External links

Category 4 South Pacific cyclones
Tropical cyclones in Fiji
Tropical cyclones in Tuvalu
Retired South Pacific cyclones